Aldwin Ware is an American former basketball player who played for Florida A&M from 1983 to 1988 (he redshirted in 1986–87). As a senior in 1987–88, he led the NCAA Division I in steals, with 142. That same season he recorded a 32-point, 11-rebound, 10-assist triple-double against Maryland Eastern Shore and was named to the first-team All-MEAC. Ware was also honored as a Black College All-American in 1987–88.

He never played professionally, however, and later worked as a framer for Mark Allen's Homes.

See also
List of NCAA Division I men's basketball players with 11 or more steals in a game
List of NCAA Division I men's basketball season steals leaders

References

Year of birth missing (living people)
Living people
American men's basketball players
Basketball players from Florida
Florida A&M Rattlers basketball players
People from St. Johns County, Florida
Point guards